Trigonopleura is a plant genus of the family Peraceae, first described as a genus in 1887. It is native to Indonesia, Malaysia, and the Philippines.

Species
 Trigonopleura dubia (Elmer) Merr. - Philippines
 Trigonopleura macrocarpa Airy Shaw - Sarawak
 Trigonopleura malayana Hook.f. - Peninsular Malaysia, Sumatra, Bangka, Borneo, Sulawesi

References

Malpighiales genera
Flora of Malesia
Peraceae